Memorial Rik Van Steenbergen (previously GP Rik Van Steenbergen) is a single-day road bicycle race held annually in September in Arendonk, Belgium. The race, paying respect to the famous Belgian rider of the 1940s and 1950s, quickly gained importance and since 2005, it is a 1.1 event on the UCI Europe Tour. The race was canceled in 2013 and again in 2014 because the organizers were unable to raise sufficient funding and subsequently disappeared permanently from the calendar before being revived for 2019. In contrary to the previous editions, the race will now be held in Arendonk where before it was held in Aartselaar.

Winners

See also
 Rik Van Steenbergen

External links
 Official Website 

UCI Europe Tour races
Recurring sporting events established in 1991
1991 establishments in Belgium
Cycle races in Belgium
Sport in Antwerp Province
Aartselaar